Justice Douglas may refer to:

 William O. Douglas, associate justice of the United States Supreme Court from 1939 to 1975
 Andrew Douglas (judge), associate justice of the Ohio Supreme Court from 1985 to 2002
 Archibald Douglas, 5th Earl of Angus, Lord Chancellor of Scotland from 1493 to 1497
 Charles Douglas III, associate justice of the New Hampshire Supreme Court
 James Marsh Douglas, associate justice of the Supreme Court of Missouri
 Michael L. Douglas, associate justice of the Supreme Court of Nevada
 Robert M. Douglas, associate justice of the North Carolina Supreme Court
 Samuel J. Douglas, associate justice of the Florida Supreme Court from 1866 to 1868
 Stephen A. Douglas, associate justice of the Illinois Supreme Court
 Thomas Douglas (American judge), chief justice of the Florida Supreme Court
 Wallace B. Douglas, associate justice of the Minnesota Supreme Court
 William W. Douglas, associate justice of the Rhode Island Supreme Court

See also
Samuel T. Douglass, associate justice of the Michigan Supreme Court